Vi har det jo dejligt is a 1963 Danish family film directed by Gabriel Axel and starring Dirch Passer.

Cast 
 Dirch Passer as Thorvald Madsen
 Ebbe Langberg as Henrik Gustafsen
 Lone Hertz as Eva Thorsen
 Karl Stegger as Fabrikant Thorsen
 Ove Sprogøe as Opfinderen
 Bodil Udsen as Opfinderens kone
 Judy Gringer as Madame Decoltas
 Jørgen Ryg as Tryllekunstner Dinga Mingh
 Karen Lykkehus as Fru Jensen
 Hans W. Petersen as Hr. Martinsen
 Ebba Amfeldt as Fru Martinsen
 Svend Bille as Brink
 Arthur Jensen as Købmand Iversen
 Bjørn Puggaard-Müller as Postbud Jensen
 Alex Suhr as Formand
 Jørgen Beck as Læge
 Valsø Holm as Hotelportier

References

External links 
 
 
 

1963 films
Danish children's films
1960s Danish-language films
Films directed by Gabriel Axel
1960s children's films